Sohran-e Vosta (also Romanized as Sohrān-e Vosţá; also known as Sohrān-e Vasaţ) is a village in Nakhlestan Rural District, in the Central District of Kahnuj County, Kerman Province, Iran. At the 2006 census, its population was 636, in 138 families.

References 

Populated places in Kahnuj County